is a Japanese rugby sevens player. She competed at the 2016 Summer Olympics for the Japan women's national rugby sevens team. Japan finished in 10th place overall. She was named in the Sakura Sevens squad to compete at the 2022 Rugby World Cup Sevens in Cape Town.

References

External links 
 Japan Player Profile
 

1995 births
Living people
People from Kanagawa Prefecture
Sportspeople from Kanagawa Prefecture
Olympic rugby sevens players of Japan
Japanese rugby sevens players
Japan international women's rugby sevens players
Rugby sevens players at the 2016 Summer Olympics
Asian Games medalists in rugby union
Rugby union players at the 2014 Asian Games
Asian Games silver medalists for Japan
Medalists at the 2014 Asian Games
Rugby sevens players at the 2020 Summer Olympics